Grane Church is a parish church of the Church of Norway in Grane Municipality in Nordland county, Norway. The church sits along the European route E06 highway, just  from the river Vefsna. It is the main church for the Grane parish which is part of the Indre Helgeland prosti (deanery) in the Diocese of Sør-Hålogaland. The white, wooden church was built in a long church style in 1860 using plans drawn up by the architects Andreas Grendestad and Andreas Nilsskog. The church seats about 230 people. The church was consecrated on 22 July 1860. A new service building was constructed near the church in 1999, and it is used for church offices. The church typically holds worship services about 20 times per year.

Media gallery

See also
List of churches in Sør-Hålogaland

References

Grane, Nordland
Churches in Nordland
Wooden churches in Norway
19th-century Church of Norway church buildings
Churches completed in 1860
1860 establishments in Norway
Long churches in Norway